For a homomorphism A → B of commutative rings, B is called an A-algebra of finite type if B is a finitely generated as an A-algebra. It is much stronger for B to be a finite A-algebra, which means that B is finitely generated as an A-module. For example, for any commutative ring A and natural number n, the polynomial ring A[x1, ..., xn] is an A-algebra of finite type, but it is not a finite A-module unless A = 0 or n = 0.

The analogous notion in terms of schemes is: a morphism f: X → Y of schemes is of finite type if Y has a covering by affine open subschemes Vi = Spec Ai such that f−1(Vi) has a finite covering by affine open subschemes Uij = Spec Bij with Bij an Ai-algebra of finite type. One also says that X is of finite type over Y.

For example, for any natural number n and field k, affine n-space and projective n-space over k are of finite type over k (that is, over Spec k), while they are not finite over k unless n = 0. More generally, any quasi-projective scheme over k is of finite type over k.

The Noether normalization lemma says, in geometric terms, that every affine scheme X of finite type over a field k has a finite surjective morphism to affine space An over k, where n is the dimension of X. Likewise, every projective scheme X over a field has a finite surjective morphism to projective space Pn, where n is the dimension of X.

See also 

 Finitely generated algebra

References 

Algebraic geometry
Morphisms